"Shaking (Party People)" is a song performed by Brazilian recording artist Kelly Key. It is the lead single from Key's seventh studio album Studio K (2012). The song was released on January 5, 2012. It features production from DJ and producer Mr. Jam, who had worked with Brazilian singer Wanessa in her 2011 album DNA and her EP Você não Perde por Esperar.

Composition

On August 28 the singer said she had begun recording an English-language track, as yet untitled, for the new album: "Wait, my first song in English is on the way, comes next week! I have done classes and studied long I am almost a native". Only on October 20 announced the title of his new single, "Shaking", saying it would be released on December 2 and bring an overproduction and a video clip released the same month.

Release History

References

2012 singles
Kelly Key songs
2012 songs